The Eddie Futch-John F.X. Condon Award, commonly referred to as the Futch–Condon Award and known alternatively as the Boxing Writers Association of America Trainer of the Year Award, has been conferred annually since 1989 by the Boxing Writers Association of America on the trainer, irrespective of nationality or gender, adjudged by the membership of the Association to have been the best in boxing in a given year.  

Named for Eddie Futch, a Detroit, Michigan-based trainer who helped Don Jordan to the world welterweight championship in 1958 and also trained or co-trained world champions Ken Norton, Joe Frazier, Larry Holmes, Michael Spinks, and Riddick Bowe, and for John F.X. Condon, for 42 years the public address announcer at Madison Square Garden and the winner of the 1984 Sam Taub Award, given by the International Boxing Hall of Fame for career "excellence in broadcasting journalism", the award is presented with other honors given by the BWAA at an annual awards dinner held in the spring of the year following that for performance in which the award is given.

List of winners

See also
Al Buck Award, conferred by the BWAA on the manager adjudged to be the best in boxing in a given year
The Ring annual awards

References

External links
List of award winners and winner biographies (boxrec.com)
List of award winners. Boxing Writers Association of America (BWAA) official website
List of BWAA awards. International Boxing Hall of Fame official website

Boxing trainers
Boxing awards